Christopher or Chris Jacobs may refer to:

 Chris Jacobs (Family Affairs), a character in TV soap opera Family Affairs
 Chris Jacobs (politician) (born 1966), Republican politician from New York
 Chris Jacobs (swimmer) (born 1964), American Olympic medalist in the sport of swimming
 Chris Jacobs (television host) (born 1970), co-host of Discovery Channel television show Overhaulin

See also
 Cris Jacobs, American singer-songwriter